Bluff Springs is a small unincorporated community in southern Travis County, Texas, United States.

External links

Unincorporated communities in Texas
Unincorporated communities in Travis County, Texas